RK Metalurg Skopje is a Macedonian handball club based in Skopje. They compete in the domestic Macedonian Handball Super League and EHF European League.

History
The club was founded in 1971 under patronage of the Skopje steel industry. There, an idea was born to form a team composed of employees that worked in the nearby steel mill. Nikola Bogdanovski accepted the idea after it was reviewed by the board of directors. Thus, RK Metalurg was created. The same concept realized by Bogdanovski continues to live today. At the time, the club didn't even think of playing in any of the European competitions, because they played their best not to be relegated from the first league. It's well worth mentioning that Metalurg in its first official match won against the team of RK Pirin with a score of 22–14. In 1974 the club created a youth team, led by Pustina Krešimir. In the following two decades, this youth team would constitute the core of the club. The first European debut for Metalurg was in 1993, when they played in the EHF City Cup, where their opponent was Belgian HC Herstal Liège. Currently, Metalurg is the best handball club in the country, and in the last five years, they've won the first league championship three times, as well as becoming national cup winners. The team regularly participates in the best European handball competitions and is currently considered as a club - national team. Macedonian national team.

In the 2011–12 season, Metalurg made it to the Last 16 of the EHF Champions League where they lost to Croatia Osiguranje Zagreb. The following season they made history, becoming the first Macedonian men's handball club to reach the EHF Champions League quarterfinals. In the 2013–14 season, they repeated their success by reaching the EHF Champions League quarterfinals for the second time in a row.

In the 2014–2015 season there were misunderstandings in the club and financial problems. At the beginning of November there were misunderstandings between the coach Lino Červar and the players, so they didn't want to play under his command. Because of that they were suspended by the management of the club. They came back so they wouldn't be eliminated from the EHF Champions League. But in the time of the crisis 7 players left the club: Stanić, Kocić, Marsenić, Borozan, Cindrić, Atman, Lipovina. As the crisis continued in 2015, 9 more players left the club: Mojsovski, Jonovski, V.Markoski, N.Markoski, Vugrinec, Mirkulovski, Dimovski, Manaskov, Georgievski. The management of the club decided to temporarily pull the shirt number 13, which in the previous 12 years wore Mirkulovski. In continuation of the season, "Metalurg" continued to play with reserve, mostly made up of young players.

Season 2018-2019 was marked as an Extraordinary . Metulurgs Squad played on 4 fronts with combined team and many new young players . Again Metalurgs youngsters from the youth team of previous seasons proved to be great investment of the club. Although they've finished third in the League and didn't make for the SEHA playoffs, they had a great season in the Macedonian Handball Cup 2019 . They've riched all the way to the final 4. In the semis they beat the tough team of HC Butel and they had to face the European Champions Vardar and their Superstars. The final was fantastic, and Metalurgs players, played their best game of the season. The thriller match ended with tie 29–29 in a very tight game from begging till the end. It came to the Penalties in the end. Metalurgs goal keeper was fantastic and he saved the crucial PK for a victory 4-3 for his team. Bringing back another CUP title in Metalurgs collection .

Arena
RK Metalurg Skopje has its own home arena in Avtokomanda with a capacity of 1,200 seats, that is where they play their domestic matches. Before the construction of its sports center, RK Metalurg played their European Cup matches at SRC Kale. In the 2008–09 season, Metalurg started playing the EHF Champions League matches at the Boris Trajkovski arena, where the average attendance was about 5,000 people.

Kits

Trophies

 Champions 
Winners  (10):1980, 1986, 1992, 2006, 2008, 2010, 2011, 2012, 2014, 2020

 Cups 
Winners   (6): 2006, 2009, 2010, 2011, 2013, 2019

 SEHA League
Finalist  : 2012
3rd  : 2013

 Double
 Winners (3): 2005–06, 2009–10, 2010–11

European record 

 EHF Cup Winners' Cup 
 2005-06 Eight-Finals Last 16 
 2008-09 Quarter-finals best 8
 2009-10 Eight-Finals Last 16

  EHF Challenge Cup 
 1993–94 Eight-Finals Last 16 
  1994–95 Round 2
  2001–02 Round 2

  EHF Cup 

  2003–04 Round 3
  2004–05 Round 3
  2007–08 Quarter-finals best 8
  2010–11 Eight-Finals best 16
  2019–20 play-off
  2020–21 Group Stage
  EHF Champions League  
 2006–07 group stage
 2008–09 group stage
 2011–12 Eight-Finals best 16
 2012–13 Quarter-finals best 8
 2013–14 Quarter-finals best 8
 2014–15 group stage
 2015–16 group stage
 2016-17 group stage
 2017–18 Group stage
 2018–19 Group stage

Team

Current squad
Squad for the 2022–23 season

Goalkeepers 

Left Wingers

Right Wingers

Line players
  Ali Kobeissi

Left Backs

Central Backs

Right Backs

Transfers
Transfers for the 2023–24 season

 Joining

 Leaving

Staff

Professional staff

Management

Former club members

Notable former players

  Filip Taleski 
  Martin Manaskov
  Dejan Manaskov 
  Borjan Madzovski
  Petar Misovski
  Nikola Mitrevski
  Goce Ojleski
  Milorad Kukoski
  Daniel Dupjačanec
  Renato Vugrinec
  Filip Mirkulovski
  Goran Krstevski
  Goran Kuzmanoski
  Lazo Majnov
  Marko Neloski
  Kostadin Petrov
  Darko Dimitrievski
  Filip Kuzmanovski
  Dimitar Dimitrioski
  Bojan Madzovski
  Martin Velkovski
  Mario Tankoski
  Filip Arsenovski
  Mice Šilegov 
  Daniel Gjorgjeski
  Martin Serafimov
  Stojanče Stoilov 
  Velko Markoski
  Nikola Markoski
  Borko Ristovski
  Goce Georgievski
  Filip Lazarov
  Aco Jonovski
  Kiril Kolev
  Stevče Aluševski
  Vančo Dimovski
  Goran Gjorgonoski
  Petar Angelov 
  Naumče Mojsovski
  Branislav Angelovski
  Zlatko Mojsovski
  Nikola Kosteski
  Stefan Drogrishki 
  Žarko Peševski
  Davor Palevski
  Martin Tomovski
  Nikola Danilovski 
  Tomislav Jagurinovski 
  Dejan Pecakovski 
  Mihajlo Mladenovikj
  Milan Lazarevski
  Daniel Dupjačanec
  Aleksandar Stojanović (handballer)
  Darko Stanić
  Darko Arsić
  Đorđe Golubović
  Janja Vojvodić
  Miloš Dragaš
  Darko Đukić
  Vojislav Brajović
  Nemanja Obradović
  Nemanja Mladenović
  Predrag Vejin
  Vanja Ilić
  Aleksandar Gugleta
  Luka Stojanović
  Nikola Potić
  Momir Rnić 
  Stefan Dodić
  Luka Mrakovčić
  Marko Buvinić
  Luka Cindrić
  Marko Matić
  Martin Marčec
  Halil Jaganjac
  Adrian Miličević
  Ante Tokić
  Marijan Marić
  Zlatko Horvat 
  Mladen Rakčević
  Stevan Vujović
  Rade Mijatović
  Vuko Borozan
  Božo Anđelić 
  Luka Vujović
  Branko Kankaraš
  Milan Popović
  Vasilije Kaluđerović
  Januš Lapajne
  David Špiler
  Miladin Kozlina
  Aleksander Špende
  Miha Pučnik 
  Damir Efendić
  Kemal Fazlić
  Dragan Vrgoč
  Marko Tarabochia
  Milan Šajin
  Žarko Marković
  Janko Božović
  Pavel Atman
  Amin Yusefinezhad
  Revaz Chanturia
  Irakli Kbilashvili
  Gonçalo Ribeiro
  Ulisses Ribeiro
  Abdoulah Mané
  Halil Öztürk

Notable former coaches
  Jovica Cvetković
  Zvonko Šundovski
  Lino Červar

Statistics

All–time Top 10 Scorers in the EHF Champions League 
As of 2018–19 season

Most appearances in the EHF Champions League 
As of 2018–19 season

References

External links
Official website 
RFM Profile 
EHF Profile 

Metalurg
H